Hwasser is a Swedish family name, which originated with Börje Larsson Hwass (died 1686). The last male bearer of the name died in 1914.

Members of the family included
 Elise Hwasser (1831-1894), actress
 Israel Hwasser (1790-1860), physician

Swedish-language surnames